Cortex is a St. Louis MetroLink station. It opened on July 31, 2018 and is located just east of Boyle Ave in the Cortex Innovation District in St. Louis' Central West End neighborhood. It was built as a public-private partnership between Bi-State Development (Metro), Washington University, BJC HealthCare, and the City of St. Louis.

In partnership with Great Rivers Greenway, the first segment of the Brickline Greenway was opened with the new station. Eventually the Brickline will travel between the Gateway Arch and Forest Park in addition to North and South St. Louis.

Station layout 
The platform is accessed via a single entrance from a plaza adjacent to the Brickline Greenway.

References

External links
 St. Louis Metro
 Cortex station satellite view
 Great Rivers Greenway

MetroLink stations in St. Louis
Railway stations in the United States opened in 2018
Red Line (St. Louis MetroLink)
Blue Line (St. Louis MetroLink)
Central West End, St. Louis